Adam Tandy is a British television producer and director, perhaps best known for his collaborations with Armando Iannucci. As such, he has worked on The Saturday Night Armistice, The Armando Iannucci Shows, Time Trumpet and The Thick of It. In 2009 he moved into film producing with the hit Thick of It adaptation In the Loop. After the 2012 series of The Thick of It, he has produced Catastrophe for Channel 4, as well as Inside No. 9, Come Fly with me and  Detectorists for the BBC.

He attended Latymer Upper School (Class of 1981).
He started studying science and engineering at university, but dropped out before graduation.
After initially working in theatre, he worked at the BBC from 1987, starting as a floor manager. He left the BBC to work as a freelance producer in 1999.

References

External links

BAFTA winners (people)
BBC people
British film producers
British television producers
Living people
Year of birth missing (living people)
People educated at Latymer Upper School